An Introduction to Islamic Cosmological Doctrines is a 1964 book by the Iranian philosopher Seyyed Hossein Nasr.

See also
 Ideals and Realities of Islam
 Three Muslim Sages

References

Sources
 
 
 
 

Seyyed Hossein Nasr
Islamic philosophical texts
Books about Islam